and  are 2014 remakes of the 2002 Game Boy Advance role-playing video games Pokémon Ruby and Sapphire, also including features from Pokémon Emerald. The games are part of the sixth generation of the Pokémon video game series and were developed by Game Freak, published by The Pokémon Company and Nintendo for the Nintendo 3DS. Announced in May 2014, the games were released in Japan, North America and Australia on 21 November 2014, exactly twelve years after the original release date of Ruby and Sapphire, while the European release was the following week. 

Omega Ruby and Alpha Sapphire received generally positive reviews from critics. As of 30 September 2022, the games have sold 14.53 million copies worldwide.

Gameplay 

Though Pokémon Omega Ruby and Alpha Sapphire are remakes of games from the third generation, they retain changes made in later generations, such as the type split from the fourth generation and unlimited TM usage and triple battles from the fifth generation. They also retain most of the features of Pokémon X and Y, such as Mega Evolution, Pokémon Amie, and Super Training.

The games introduced new features including Primal Reversion for Groudon and Kyogre, as well as using Latios or Latias to fly around Hoenn. When flying around on Latios or Latias, players may encounter "mirage spots". These spots feature Pokémon not otherwise available in the Hoenn region, as well as numerous legendary Pokémon from previous generations.

Setting and story 

The setting and story of Omega Ruby and Alpha Sapphire are largely the same as the original Ruby and Sapphire games. They begin as the player is seen riding in the back of a moving truck. The player character starts by moving to the Hoenn region from the Johto region with their mother, as their father Norman has been hired as the leader of the Petalburg City Gym. The player arrives with their parents at the family's new home in the village of Littleroot Town, on the southern edge of the main island. The player character begins their Pokémon Trainer journey by saving Professor Birch, the leading scientist in the Hoenn region, from a wild Pokémon, choosing either Treecko, Torchic, or Mudkip to defend him. Following the defeat of the wild Pokémon, the player receives the chosen Pokémon as their starter. The player then travels around Hoenn to complete the Pokédex and battle the eight Gym Leaders of the Hoenn Pokémon League.

Along the way, the player character encounters the antagonist group Team Magma in Omega Ruby or Team Aqua in Alpha Sapphire who wish to use the power of the legendary Pokémon, Primal Groudon in Omega Ruby, and Primal Kyogre in Alpha Sapphire, to change the world to suit their desires. Team Magma wants to use Groudon to dry up the oceans and expand the landmass, thereby allowing humanity to progress further. Meanwhile, Team Aqua wishes to summon Kyogre to flood the lands and revert the world to a prehistoric state, which will allow Pokémon to live more freely. However, unlike in the original games, depending on the game version, Archie and Maxie will actually use the correct orb, leading to their Primal Reversions. With the help of Hoenn League Champion Steven Stone, and the Gym Leader Wallace, the player defeats their respective team and then either captures or defeats the legendary Pokémon to prevent a global drought / heavy rainfall and thus ensuring the teams' mutual reformation. The player then advances on to the Pokémon League, challenging the Elite Four and then the Champion, Steven, to become the new Hoenn Pokémon League Champion. The player also has the option of participating in the various Pokémon Contests throughout Hoenn, using their Pokémon to put on a performance for an audience and judges. Aside from the gameplay, 21 new Mega Evolutions were added since Pokémon X and Y, as well as "primal reversions" for Groudon and Kyogre, which function similarly. 

A new side quest is featured in Omega Ruby and Alpha Sapphire, called the "Delta Episode". The player must work with the new character, Zinnia, as well as Steven Stone and Professor Cozmo, to find a way to stop a meteor from crashing into the planet. This also requires capturing the legendary Pokémon Rayquaza in order to stop the meteor that holds the mythical Pokémon Deoxys.

Release 
Pokémon Omega Ruby and Alpha Sapphire were released in Japan, North America and Australia on 21 November 2014, exactly twelve years after the original release date of Ruby and Sapphire, while the European release was the following week. They are the third remake pairs in the franchise following Pokémon FireRed and LeafGreen for the Game Boy Advance in 2004 and Pokémon HeartGold and SoulSilver for the Nintendo DS in 2009. As with Pokémon X and Y, the games include all official translations, unlike previous generations where games contained only certain languages depending on the region or country they were originally distributed.

Reception 

Pokémon Omega Ruby and Alpha Sapphire received generally positive reviews from critics. GameSpots Peter Brown praised the 3D visuals and the super training mechanic, but believed the game failed to fully resolve general issues in the game formula. IGNs  Kallie Plagge also praised the game's 3D reinvention of Hoenn and online functionality. Plagge was, however, critical of the over-abundance of HMs needed to play the game as well as the perceived imbalance favoring Water-type Pokémon and the reliance on water-based routes. She remarked that while the Dive feature was novel in the original release, it had since become tedious.

At the 2014 Game Awards it was nominated for Best Remaster, but lost out to Grand Theft Auto V.

Sales 
The games sold 3,040,000 copies in their first three days of sale. Of the total sales, 1,534,593 copies were sold in Japan, the rest were sold in North America and Australia. Omega Ruby and Alpha Sapphire had the biggest launch in the series history in the United Kingdom, beating the previous record held by Pokémon Black and White. By the end of 2014, the games had sold 2.4 million copies in Japan. As of 30 September 2022, the games have sold 14.53 million copies worldwide.

Notes

References

External links 
  (US)
  

2014 video games
Game Freak games
Japanese role-playing video games
Multiplayer and single-player video games
Nintendo 3DS eShop games
Nintendo 3DS games
Nintendo 3DS-only games
Nintendo Network games
Omega Ruby and Alpha Sapphire
Role-playing video games
Video game remakes
Video game sequels
Video games developed in Japan
Video games featuring protagonists of selectable gender
Video games set on fictional islands
Video games with alternative versions
Video games scored by Junichi Masuda
Video games scored by Shota Kageyama
Video games with cel-shaded animation